Sterling Sandmann Knight (born March 5, 1989) is an American actor, singer, and dancer. He is known for his role as Chad Dylan Cooper in the Disney Channel sitcom Sonny with a Chance and its spinoff So Random!, Zander Carlson in Melissa & Joey, and Christopher Wilde in the Disney Channel Original Movie Starstruck.

Early life
Knight was born in Hilton Head Island, South Carolina. He has a sister, Samantha Scarlett, and a brother, Spencer Shuga.

Career
Knight began his career on stage in local productions.  He made his acting debut in minor roles in Calm, Career Day, and Hi-Jinks. Knight's first role with Disney was in an episode of Hannah Montana, playing Lilly’s boyfriend Lucas, in 2007. Later in the year, Knight also appeared in two episodes of The Closer. In 2008, Knight appeared in Out of Jimmy's Head and Grey's Anatomy. In 2009, Knight played the role of Chad Dylan Cooper, an egotistical and self-centered cast member of Mackenzie Falls and self-proclaimed Hollywood legend in Sonny with a Chance. Knight made his film debut in 17 Again playing Alex O'Donnell, Matthew Perry/Zac Efron's son who was abused by his sister's boyfriend.

In 2010, Knight played teen heart-throb Christopher Wilde in the Disney Channel Original Movie(DCOM) Starstruck. According to comments made by Knight on Twitter, because he joined the cast so late, he only sang one song on the soundtrack, the opening song. His character's remaining songs were sung by Drew Ryan Scott. Knight's next project was the movie Elle: A Modern Cinderella Tale with Ashlee Hewitt. He plays Ty Parker, a singer/songwriter who's looking for a change in his music and then finds a girl recording in a studio and when she leaves him he goes on a journey to find her. The movie was released in April 2010.

In 2011, Knight returned to be in the Sonny with a Chance spinoff sketch comedy series So Random!. His recurring characters on So Random! included Possibly Sarcastic Skip, Dwayne Platowski, and Jimmy Sparrow and his impressions included Ralph Fiennes (as Lord Voldemort), Lucas Cruikshank (as Fred), Taylor Lautner (as Jacob Black), and Justin Bieber. The show was cancelled after one season.

In 2012, Knight starred as Shane Seedwell in the action thriller film Transit co-starring Jim Caviezel and Elisabeth Rohm. As of 2013 he is appearing as a guest star on Melissa & Joey as Lennox's boyfriend and later fiancé Zander. Knight returned for the 4th and final season in 2014. In 2014, he starred as Billy in The Hotwives of Orlando, a Hulu original series.

In 2015, Knight starred as Chris in the action crime drama film Landmine Goes Click. In 2016, Knight guest-starred in two episodes of NBC series Crowded, where he played the love interest of Miranda Cosgrove's character. In 2017, he starred as Cameron Fullbright in the go90 comedy series In the Rough. He had a supporting role in the movie Different Flowers. He played the role of Philip in the sci-fi drama The Man from Earth: Holocene.

Filmography

Awards and nominations

Notes

References

External links
 

21st-century American male actors
Male actors from Houston
American male child actors
American child singers
American male film actors
American male television actors
Living people
1989 births
21st-century American male singers
21st-century American singers